Ways and Means is the name of a government body that is charged with reviewing and making recommendations for government budgets.

Ways and Means may also refer to:

Arts
 "Ways and Means" (The West Wing), an episode of the television series The West Wing
 Ways and Means (play) a short 1935 play by Noël Coward
Ways and Means (1788 play), a play by George Colman the Younger
 Ways and Means (Xenophon), believed to be the last work written by Xenophon of Athens
 "Ways and Means" (Porridge), an episode of the BBC sitcom Porridge

Music
 Ways & Means (album) an album by Paul Kelly
 "Ways and Means" (poem), a song by Lewis Carroll
 "Ways and Means", a song by Snow Patrol from their 2003 album Final Straw